Highsmith is an album by Craig Taborn and Ikue Mori. It was released in 2017 by Tzadik Records.

Background
Pianist Craig Taborn and electronics player Ikue Mori first performed as a duo at the Village Vanguard in December 2016. "Taborn, in addition to his status as a top tier jazz pianist, is one of the more dynamic employers of electronics in his music."

Release and reception
Highsmith was released by Tzadik Records in May 2017. An All About Jazz reviewer concluded that the album "takes the electro/acoustic marriage deeper, crafting a unique improvised sound." The Chicago Reader reviewer described the recording as "one of the best recordings" in Mori's career.

Track listing
"The Still Point of the Turning World"
"Music to Die By"
"Two Disagreeable Pigeons"
"Nothing That Meets the Eye"
"Variations on a Game"
"Quiet Night"
"A Bird in Hand"
"Dangerous Hobby"
"Things Had Gone Badly"
"Mermaids on the Golf Course"
"Trouble with the World"

Personnel
Craig Taborn – piano
Ikue Mori – electronics

References

Craig Taborn albums
Tzadik Records albums
Ikue Mori albums